Shotty is an indie rock band from Seattle, WA.  After its formation in 2004 as a solo project of vocalist/guitarist Pat Moon, today Shotty is presented with 2 long-term members, including Miles Frank on the drums.  In their early years, Shotty released a steady stream of music that includes four out of print albums and many demo CD's.  Shotty’s music combines elements of guitar-heavy 90’s grunge and alternative rock, synth-heavy 80’s new wave music, as well as a modern Seattle indie aesthetic.

Shotty were semi-finalists in the 2008 EMP Sound Off! battle of the bands at the Experience Music Project. In 2009, Shotty worked with Seattle producer Martin Feveyear to record a 3-song EP that was released the same year, followed by a home recorded 7-song EP.  Both releases are now out of print.  In 2011, Shotty were finalists in the Hard Rock Cafe Battle of the Bands competition.

Shotty has performed across the west coast at venues including the Whisky a Go Go, The Viper Room, and Northwest Folklife Festival, as well as appearances on the east coast, including a New York Fashion Week showcase event in New York City.  Shotty has performed with Gosling, Natalie Portman's Shaved Head, Sirens Sister, New Faces, and many other bands.

Shotty released their first official full-length album, Superfan, in 2011.  Later in the year they tracked drums for their second album at Swing House Studio in Hollywood, California.  The rest of the instruments were recorded at Crackle & Pop Recording Studio in Seattle, Washington by Johnny Sangster (Mudhoney), and mixed at Electrokitty Recording.   Shotty released 3 songs from the sessions in an EP titled 2012 EP.

In 2013, Shotty worked with Clatter & Din Studios and Rob Daiker (Royal Bliss, The Fame Riot) to record a single titled Goodnight.  Later in the year, Shotty relocated to Los Angeles, CA and began working on recordings with producer Norm Block (Plexi, Sweethead).

Shotty released their first in a series of EPs; a Double A-side called I'm Glad It's Over / So Long.  The EP was released by the indie record label Cautionary Tail Records via INgrooves Music Group, part of the Manimal Label Group.  The followed up by two music videos, and premiered on various music websites.

shotty has also confirmed the release of a new album (date unconfirmed), and hinted at the release of an album made entirely of cover songs

Superfan
Superfan is Shotty's first full length album. Recorded in Shotty's own studio, and mixed by Pat Moon, Superfan was released independently in March, 2011.

Track list 
 "The Girls" – 4:13
 "Go for it" – 3:21
 "Superfan" – 3:36
 "Frankly" – 2:24
 "Generalize" – 3:59
 "Villa" – 3:52
 "Butterfly" – 3:10
 "Maybe not" – 3:08
 "Pick up the Phone" – 2:09
 "Collapse" – 3:40
 "Why" – 4:28
 "Oh Well" – 3:42
 "Very Very Bad" – 3:35
 "Took Off" – 3:22
 "Other" – 3:36
 "Rejected" – 3:27
 "Never Run" – 2:28
 "Mellow" – 4:03
 "..." – 1:34

2012 EP
2012 EP is a demo of three songs from Shotty's second album.  It was released in June, 2012.  Shotty made a homemade music video for the songs Louder and Just Having Fun.  The videos were directed and edited by Pat Moon and released on YouTube in the summer of 2012.

Track list
 "Just Having Fun" – 3:13
 "Louder" – 4:04
 "The Real You" – 3:39

Goodnight (single)
Goodnight is a single released in November, 2013.  The drums were recorded in Clatter & Din Studios, and the rest of the instruments were recorded in Pat Moon Studios.  The song was mixed and mastered by Rob Daiker.

Track list 
 "Goodnight" – 4:00

I'm Glad It's Over / So Long
I'm Glad It's Over / So Long is a double A-side recorded by Norm Block and Pat Moon.  It was released through Cautionary Tail Records.

Track list 
 "I'm Glad It's Over" – 3:24
 "So Long" – 4:00

Little Lady Death
The mini-album (EP), released October 30, 2015 through Cautionary Tail Records.

Track list 

 Love Mess - 03:38
 Magic 8 - 03:25
 Famous Face - 03:29
 Blood And Stars - 03:40
 Don't Care Anymore - 03:09

This Is Where We Go
The single, released August 7, 2020

Track list 
 "This Is Where We Go" – 03:36

Caramel
The single, released September 25, 2020

Track list 
 "Caramel" – 03:38

I Wanna Get to Know You
The single, released December 4, 2020

Track list 
 "I Wanna Get to Know You" – 03:30

Kiss my teeth sessions 2013
"Kiss My Teeth Sessions 2013" is a collection of songs originally intended to be shotty's second full length album. The drums were recorded at Clatter & Din Studios in Seattle, and the rest of the instruments were recorded in Pat Moon Studios. Released independently on May 7, 2021.

Track list
 "Act" - 3:43
 "Been done before" - 2:27
 "Love hate candy heartbreak" - 3:57
 "It used to be OK" - 1:36
 "Big cheesed" - 3:04
 "Little ball" - 3:07
 "Some dumb kid" - 3:34
 "Serenity" - 2:08
 "Huntress" - 4:46
 "New everything" - 3:10
 "Quiet time" - 2:56
 "Strong enough for a cup of tea" - 2:22

References

External links

 Local band Shotty shines in Seattle

Indie rock musical groups from Washington (state)
Musical groups established in 2004
Musical groups from Seattle